Burntside Lodge is a resort on the southern shore of Burntside Lake in Morse Township, Minnesota, United States, outside the city of Ely. It has been in operation for over a century.

Founding 
Burntside Lodge was originally known as the Brownell Outing Company and was established as a hunting camp in the early twentieth century, during which part of the main lodge was built. In about 1913, two brothers, William A. and Lyman Alden, purchased the property and created Burntside Lodge.

Since 1941 
The resort was purchased from the Aldens in 1941 by Ray and Nancy LaMontagne, who actively owned and managed the historic resort for 42 years.  years later it continues in the LaMontagne family. As of 2019, Burntside Lodge is operated by Ray and Nancy's son Lou, his wife Lonnie, and their adult children Nicole and Jacques.

National Register of Historic Places 
Burntside Lodge was listed as a historic district on the National Register of Historic Places in 1988 for its local significance in the themes of architecture and entertainment/recreation.  It was nominated for being northern St. Louis County's first full-scale commercial resort and its finest collection of log resort buildings.

Description 
The resort consists of 23 cabins.  The cabins at Burntside Lodge vary in design, size, and location. Many were constructed during the 1920s of native timbers, and all have wood floors and knotty pine interiors.  The lodge's National Register nomination says of them: "Built of local materials by local craftsmen, these buildings are a remarkable architectural achievement in an outstanding state of preservation".

See also
 National Register of Historic Places listings in St. Louis County, Minnesota

References

External links
 Burntside Lodge

1914 establishments in Minnesota
Buildings and structures in St. Louis County, Minnesota
Historic districts on the National Register of Historic Places in Minnesota
Hotel buildings completed in 1914
Hotel buildings on the National Register of Historic Places in Minnesota
National Register of Historic Places in St. Louis County, Minnesota
Resorts in Minnesota
Rustic architecture in Minnesota
Tourist attractions in St. Louis County, Minnesota